Sir Lindsay Harvey Hoyle (born 10 June 1957) is a British politician who has served as Speaker of the House of Commons since 2019 and as Member of Parliament (MP) for Chorley since 1997. Before his election as Speaker, he was a member of the Labour Party.

As a Labour MP, Hoyle served as Chairman of Ways and Means and Deputy Speaker to John Bercow from 2010 to 2019, before being elected as Speaker on 4 November 2019. Hoyle was unanimously re-elected as Speaker five days after the 2019 general election on 17 December.

Early life

The son of former Labour MP Doug Hoyle (born 1930), now Baron Hoyle, and Pauline Spencer (died 1991), Hoyle was born and raised in Adlington, Lancashire. He went to Anderton County Primary School in Adlington and Lord's College in Bolton. Prior to being elected as an MP, he ran his own textile and screen printing business.

Political career

Councillor

In the 1980 local elections, Hoyle was elected as the Labour Chorley Borough Councillor for the Adlington ward, defeating the sitting Conservative. He was re-elected four times, and served as Deputy Leader from 1994 to 1997. After being elected as an MP in 1997, he ended his time on the council as the annual Mayor before stepping down at the local election in 1998.

Backbench MP

In February 1996, Hoyle was chosen to stand as the Labour candidate for the Chorley constituency at the 1997 general election. He won the election with a majority of 9,870, becoming the first Labour MP for Chorley in eighteen years.

In the days after the death of Diana, Princess of Wales, in August 1997, Hoyle asked for a new national children's hospital to be built as a memorial to her. A few days later, Hoyle wrote to airport operator BAA, operators of London Heathrow Airport, urging them to change the airport's name to Diana, Princess of Wales Airport. Neither proposal was carried out.

Hoyle served as a member of the Trade and Industry Committee (later the Business Committee) from 1998 to 2010 and as a member of the European Scrutiny Committee from 2005 to 2010. He is currently the President of the All-Party British Gibraltar Group in Parliament (of which his father is the Treasurer) and a Vice Chair of the All-Party British Virgin Islands Group.

Hoyle clashed with then Prime Minister Tony Blair over issues such as Gibraltar and tuition fees. Regarding those clashes, Hoyle would say "I'm not anti-Tony; he made us electable and won three times. But there are principles and promises you don't break".

Hoyle voted against the Lisbon Treaty in 2008. Hoyle is one of the few MPs who have not revealed whether they voted Leave or Remain in the 2016 referendum.

Chairman of Ways and Means

Hoyle was elected Deputy Speaker of the House of Commons and Chairman of Ways and Means on 8 June 2010, the first time this appointment had been made by ballot of MPs, rather than by nomination of the Leader of the House. He was appointed to the Privy Council in January 2013.

On 20 March 2013, Hoyle won wide public acclaim for his handling of the Budget proceedings, which were frequently interrupted by jeering MPs.

In February 2017, Hoyle scolded SNP MPs for singing the European Anthem during the vote for the Brexit bill in the House of Commons, stating that he did not want parliament to turn into a sing-off. The same night, he had a clash with former Scottish First Minister Alex Salmond in a heated exchange over whether Hoyle had cut off an SNP MP while speaking.

In March 2017, Hoyle called on social media companies to take swifter action to crack down on offensive posts, arguing it deters Jewish and Muslim women from becoming MPs.

Hoyle was in the Speaker's Chair during the terrorist attack in Westminster on 22 March 2017, and the subsequent suspension and lockdown of the Commons. 

Hoyle was appointed a Knight Bachelor in the 2018 New Year Honours for parliamentary and political services.

Speaker of the House of Commons (2019–present) 

On 4 November 2019, Hoyle entered the election for Speaker to replace John Bercow. In the days leading up to the election, Hoyle was consistently seen by the media as the front runner. Hoyle maintained a substantial lead in the first, second, and third ballots of the election, but without reaching the 50% required to win.

Hoyle was elected Speaker on the fourth ballot, defeating Chris Bryant and winning 325 votes out of a total of 540 cast. Hoyle then duly received royal approbation in the House of Lords. In accordance with convention, following the election Hoyle rescinded his Labour Party membership.

In his acceptance speech, Hoyle stated that "this House will change, but it will change for the better", and stated that he would be a "transparent" Speaker, also pledging to take the welfare of House of Commons staff seriously. He was unanimously confirmed as Speaker after the 2019 election.

Hoyle became the first Speaker since Sir Harry Hylton-Foster and only the third Speaker of the British House of Commons to possess a knighthood at the point of his election.

On 16 October 2021, Hoyle accompanied Boris Johnson, Sir Keir Starmer and Priti Patel in laying wreaths at the church in Leigh-on-Sea, Essex where MP David Amess was murdered the day before.

In September 2022, Hoyle described the state funeral of Queen Elizabeth II as "the most important event the world will ever see". Hoyle's comments received criticism. Graham Smith, CEO of the republican campaign group Republic, responded by saying that  it was "one of the most stupid things the world has ever heard". Writing in Indy100, Liam O'Dell highlighted Hoyle was ignoring current issues like the ongoing cost of living crisis and war in Ukraine.

In December 2022, he voiced opposition to his former party's plan of replacing the House of Lords with an elected upper chamber.

Personal life

Hoyle lives in Adlington, Lancashire. As Speaker of the House of Commons he has an official residence at Speaker's House, at the northeast corner of the Palace of Westminster, which is used for official functions and meetings and which has private accommodation in a four-bedroom apartment upstairs.

Hoyle has been married twice and has had two daughters. He was married from 1974 to Lynda Anne Fowler; they divorced in 1982. In June 1993, Hoyle married Catherine Swindley, who succeeded him as the Labour Councillor for Adlington in May 1998. He has also employed his wife as his part-time constituency secretary. Hoyle's elder daughter, Emma, used to work at his constituency office, in which capacity she represented him at Chorley Borough Council.

Hoyle and Conservative Maldon District Councillor Miriam Lewis also had a daughter, Natalie Lewis-Hoyle, who was found hanged in her bedroom, in December 2017, at the age of 28. Hoyle said he was "truly devastated" by her death. An inquest subsequently returned an open verdict as to the cause of death.

Away from politics, he is a supporter of his local football league team, Bolton Wanderers, and rugby league team Warrington Wolves. He currently serves as President of the Rugby Football League.

Hoyle has described himself as an animal lover and houses a number of pets, which he has named after notable figures in British political history. Amongst them are his parrot Boris (after former Conservative Prime Minister Boris Johnson), his tortoise Maggie (after Margaret Thatcher) and Attlee (Clement Attlee), his brown tabby Maine Coon cat. He also operates an Instagram page for the latter, where he regularly shares pictures of his animals.

He stated that he had been diagnosed with Type 1 diabetes shortly before the 2019 general election.

From his father's ennoblement in 1997 he was entitled to the style of The Honourable. He gained the style of The Right Honourable when sworn into the Privy Council on 12 February 2013. Hoyle was appointed as the Chancellor of the University of Gibraltar in 2020.

References

External links

 
BBC Politics page
Debrett's People of Today

|-

|-

|-

|-

|-

|-

1957 births
20th-century English businesspeople
Knights Bachelor
Labour Party (UK) councillors
Labour Party (UK) MPs for English constituencies
Living people
Members of the Privy Council of the United Kingdom
People from Adlington, Lancashire
People with type 1 diabetes
Politics of Chorley
Politicians awarded knighthoods
Speakers of the House of Commons of the United Kingdom
UK MPs 1997–2001
UK MPs 2001–2005
UK MPs 2005–2010
UK MPs 2010–2015
UK MPs 2015–2017
UK MPs 2017–2019
UK MPs 2019–present
Sons of life peers